Flight to Rhythm, also known as The Delora Bueno Show, was an early American television program which aired on the DuMont Television Network, and was produced by Bob Loewi (1911–1981), son of DuMont executive Mortimer Loewi (1888–1967) .

Broadcast history
The series ran from March to September 1949, and was a musical program hosted by Brazilian vocalist and musician Delora Bueno (1925–2012). The program, produced and distributed by DuMont, was originally titled The Delora Bueno Show, and aired Thursday nights at 7pm ET on most DuMont affiliates.

In May, the series was retitled Flight to Rhythm and was expanded to thirty minutes. The revamped production was set in a fictional Brazilian nightclub called "Club Rio" with Nick the Bartender (Ralph Statley) hosting each episode. In addition to Bueno, Flight featured Larry Carr and the Miguelito Valdés Orchestra. The program aired on Sunday nights at 6:30pm ET during the summer, and moved to Thursday at 8pm ET in August.

Episode status
Two episodes, the March 10 premiere and the May 15, 1949 episode, are in the Paley Center for Media collection.

See also
List of programs broadcast by the DuMont Television Network
List of surviving DuMont Television Network broadcasts

References

Bibliography
David Weinstein, The Forgotten Network: DuMont and the Birth of American Television (Philadelphia: Temple University Press, 2004) 
Alex McNeil, Total Television, Fourth edition (New York: Penguin Books, 1980) 
Tim Brooks and Earle Marsh, The Complete Directory to Prime Time Network TV Shows, Third edition (New York: Ballantine Books, 1964)

External links

DuMont historical website

DuMont Television Network original programming
1949 American television series debuts
1949 American television series endings
American music television series
Black-and-white American television shows